Henry Anderson Rodríguez Lorenzo (born November 8, 1967) is a Dominican former professional baseball outfielder, who played in Major League Baseball (MLB) for the Montreal Expos, Chicago Cubs, Los Angeles Dodgers, New York Yankees, and Florida Marlins from 1992 to 2002.

Rodríguez was a member of the 1996 National League (NL) All-Star team as a member of the Expos, hitting a career high 36 home runs that year; which was the Expos team record at the time.  He was voted the Montreal Expos Player of the Year in 1996.

Rodríguez was a key player on the Cubs 1998 Wild Card winning team, and the addition of his bat into the cleanup slot in the Cub lineup helped give slugger Sammy Sosa, who hit third, an advantage, as Sosa slugged 66 home runs in 1998.

In Montreal, it became a tradition to throw Oh Henry! bars onto the field after a Rodriguez home run. "Oh Henry" was a popular home run call from Expos broadcaster Rodger Brulotte.

In 2005, while playing for the Long Island Ducks of the independent Atlantic League, Rodriguez led the league with a .322 batting average.

References

External links

1967 births
Living people
Albuquerque Dukes players
Bakersfield Dodgers players
Chicago Cubs players
Dominican Republic expatriate baseball players in Canada
Dominican Republic expatriate baseball players in Mexico
Dominican Republic expatriate baseball players in the United States
Florida Marlins players
Gulf Coast Dodgers players

Long Island Ducks players
Los Angeles Dodgers players
Major League Baseball left fielders
Major League Baseball players from the Dominican Republic
Mexican League baseball left fielders
Montreal Expos players
Nashua Pride players
National League All-Stars
New York Yankees players
Olmecas de Tabasco players
Ottawa Lynx players
Salem Dodgers players
San Antonio Missions players
Vero Beach Dodgers players